Vlorë District was one of the 36 districts of Albania, which were dissolved in July 2000 and replaced by 12 newly created counties. It is in the south-west of the country, and its capital was the city of Vlorë. Its territory is now part of Vlorë County: the municipalities of Vlorë, Selenicë and Himara (partly). Its population included a Greek minority.

Administrative divisions
The district consisted of the following municipalities:

Armen
Brataj
Himara
Kotë
Novoselë
Orikum
Qendër Vlorë
Selenicë
Sevaster
Shushicë
Vllahinë
Vlorë
Vranisht

Other places in this district included Dhërmi, Palasë, Nartë and Kocul.

Vlorë is the closest point of the Albanian coast to the Italian Peninsula.

References

External links
Postcard of the Vlorë coast
The site of Vlorë (in albanian)

Districts of Albania
Geography of Vlorë County